Heliopetes is a Neotropical genus of spread-winged skipper butterflies in the family Hesperiidae.

Species
These species belong to the genus Heliopetes:

 Heliopetes alana (Reakirt, 1868) (alana white-skipper)
 Heliopetes americanus (Blanchard, 1852)
 Heliopetes arsalte (Linnaeus, 1758) (veined white-skipper)
 Heliopetes chimbo Evans, 1953
 Heliopetes domicella (Erichson, 1849) (Erichson's white-skipper)
 Heliopetes ericetorum (Boisduval, 1852) (northern white-skipper)
 Heliopetes laviana (Hewitson, 1868) (laviana white-skipper)
 Heliopetes leucola (Hewitson, 1868)
 Heliopetes libra Evans, 1944
 Heliopetes macaira (Reakirt, 1867) (Turk's-cap white-skipper)
 Heliopetes marginata Hayward, 1940
 Heliopetes nivella (Mabille, 1883)
 Heliopetes ochroleuca J. Zikán, 1938
 Heliopetes omrina (A. Butler, 1870) (stained white-skipper)
 Heliopetes orbigera (Mabille, 1888)
 Heliopetes petrus (Hübner, [1819])
 Heliopetes purgia Schaus, 1902
 Heliopetes sublinea Schaus, 1902 (east-mexican white-skipper)

References

 , 1937: New genera and species of Neotropical Hesperiidae with notes on some others (Lepidoptera: Rhopalocera). American Museum Novitates 914: 1-17. Full article: .
  1944: An analysis of the genus Heliopetes Billberg (Lepidoptera-Hesperiidae) with genitalia drawings. Entomol., London, 77: 179-185.
 , 2004; Atlas of Neotropical Lepidoptera; Checklist: Part 4A; Hesperioidea - Papilionoidea.

External links
Natural History Museum Lepidoptera genus database
Heliopetes at Markku Savela's Lepidoptera and Some Other Life Forms

Pyrgini
Hesperiidae of South America
Hesperiidae genera
Taxa named by Gustaf Johan Billberg